Geiseltalsee Solarpark, also known as Geiseltalsee, is a 4 MWp photovoltaic power plant located in Merseburg, Germany.  The power plant was constructed by BP Solar using 24,864 BP solar modules.  The power station was completed in 2004

See also

Photovoltaic power stations
Solar power in Germany

References

Photovoltaic power stations in Germany